Loch Dornal is an irregular shaped, shallow, freshwater loch in south Ayrshire, in the Southern Uplands of  Scotland.

There are several islets in the loch some of which contain archaeological features.

The loch is stocked with rainbow trout and fishing is permitted with permission from Drumlamford Estate.

Survey
The loch was surveyed in 1903 by James Murray and later charted  as part of Sir John Murray's Bathymetrical Survey of Fresh-Water Lochs of Scotland 1897-1909.

References

Freshwater lochs of Scotland